The 1962 season of the Venezuelan Primera División, the top category of Venezuelan football, was played by 6 teams. The national champions were Deportivo Portugués.

Results

Standings

Championship play-off

External links
Venezuela 1962 season at RSSSF

Ven
Venezuelan Primera División seasons
1962 in Venezuelan sport